Pleurotomella marshalli is a species of sea snail, a marine gastropod mollusk in the family Raphitomidae.

Description
The length of the shell attains 4.5 mm, its diameter 1.8 mm

(Original description) The elongate-fusiform shell is fairly solid. The spire is well drawn out. The colour (dead specimen ) is whitish-brown. The shell contains  7½ convex, regularly increasing whorls. The protoconch is pointed, well exserted, of about 3½ whorls, worn and polished but bearing traces of the regular "Clathurella-sculpture". The consequent whorls bear rounded longitudinal riblets of fair size, crossed by a number of spiral threads (about 6 on the penultimate whorl), and showing traces of a smoother area below the suture. The aperture is of fair size, with a short, slightly recurved, siphonal canal.

Distribution
This marine species occurs off Portugal.

References

External links
 

marshalli
Gastropods described in 1906